Neo Geo Cup '98: The Road to the Victory is a soccer video game based on the FIFA World Cup 1998, despite being released after the 1998 FIFA World Cup. It features 64 teams' countries. Each team enters a "Regional Qualifying Round Final" where it plays a team it actually played in the 1998 FIFA World Cup qualification. For example: Spain would face Yugoslavia, an opponent it actually faced in its qualifying group. Or Italy would face Russia, an opponent Italy faced in the UEFA play-offs. If the player beats the opponent, it goes to a group much like the real life World Cup. In fact, the team faces opponents that were actually in its group. For example: Mexico would face the Netherlands, Belgium and South Korea. It is a re-make of Super Sidekicks 3. However, animations and designs were exactly the same. The only difference is teams to reflect the World Cup, kits again to reflect the World Cup, and players to resemble squads from the World Cup (teams that did not qualify use line-ups from friendly games and qualifiers). Its slogan is "We got the kick".

Unlike its arcade counterpart, the Neo Geo version tries to be more of a soccer simulation game. Differences include the Neo Geo version being more slowed down, and more realism added in shooting, passing, etc. A color version of the game was released for the Neo Geo Pocket Color as Neo Geo Cup '98 Plus Color.

Playable teams 
The game has 64 countries, grouped in 8 zones:

Tournaments

The tournaments in the game are the following ones (between parenthesis, the real tournaments in which were based):

World Tournament (1998 FIFA World Cup)
Europe Tournament (UEFA Euro 1996)
South America Tournament (1997 Copa América)
Americas Tournament (1998 CONCACAF Gold Cup)
Africa Tournament (1998 African Cup of Nations)
Asia Tournament (1996 AFC Asian Cup)

Release 
 is a football videogame released in Japan by SNK in 1998 for the Neo Geo Pocket handheld system. The game was released in Europe as Neo Geo Cup '98 Plus. It is a scaled down port of the arcade game featuring black and white graphics.

This release should not be confused with  the previous European release, since the Japanese version of Plus is compatible with the Neo Geo Pocket Color handheld system. The version was released in North America and Europe as Neo Geo Cup '98 Plus Color. It is an update of Neo Geo Cup '98 with, as its title suggests, colour graphics.

In both releases, there are three game modes; single- a single "exhibition" match, 2p play- an option for two players with two Neo Geo Pocket Colour systems, Neo Geo Cup '98 cartridges and a link cable to play against each other, and story mode- a career mode in which players compete in the Neo Geo Cup competition, play friendly matches, play against friends via the link cable and purchase "power-ups" at the Soccer Shop using credits gained in the Neo Geo Cup competition.

Inconsistencies
Due to failure of getting any official FIFA license (EA Sports held the license) the tournaments are all unlicensed. Also, due to lack of FIFPro license player names are fake. For Example: Ronaldo is known as Rosa, Raúl is known as Roul,  Luis Hernández is known as Hernardo, Eric Wynalda is known as Wyoming, Carlos Valderrama is known as Valledupar and Martin Dahlin is known as Dahlgren. However, most players appearance in this game resembles their real-life appearance. Easily identical players are: Colin Hendry (blonde hair), Luis Hernández (blonde hair and caucasian skin), and Jorge Campos (goalkeeper kit) and others appear in the game. However, others appearance are inaccurate. Like Ronaldo is dark-skinned.

Though a majority of team qualifying matches are accurate, there are inconsistencies with some of the team's qualifier opponents. For example, England would face Scotland (although the player can also be paired against Italy, a team England faced in the 1998 qualifiers). Brazil would also play a qualifier against Uruguay. Brazil qualified automatically due to the rule that the winner of the last FIFA World Cup would qualify automatically.

Also, some players have incorrect numbers. For example: Hernán Crespo (Cresko in the game) has the number 11. But in reality he wore number 19, number 11 was worn by Juan Sebastián Verón.

See also

 Super Sidekicks
 Tecmo World Cup '90
 Tecmo World Cup Soccer
 International Superstar Soccer
 Legendary Eleven

Notes

References

External links 

 Neo Geo Cup '98: The Road to the Victory at GameFAQs
 Neo Geo Cup '98: The Road to the Victory at Giant Bomb
 Neo Geo Cup '98: The Road to the Victory at Killer List of Videogames
 Neo Geo Cup '98: The Road to the Victory at MobyGames

1998 video games
1998 FIFA World Cup
ACA Neo Geo games
Association football video games
Neo Geo games
Neo Geo Pocket Color games
SNK games
Video games developed in Japan